Terrence Olondo Wilkins (born July 29, 1975) is a former American football wide receiver and return specialist for the Indianapolis Colts. He also played with St. Louis Rams, and was a preseason member of the Miami Dolphins in 2004 and also played with the Calgary Stampeders in the Canadian Football League in 2005. He had 1,466 career receiving yards with the Colts, and was also part of the Super Bowl XLI-winning  team during the 2006 season, beating the Chicago Bears.

Terrence Wilkins graduated from Bishop Denis J. O'Connell High School in Arlington, Virginia in 1994. Previously, he attended St. Stephen's and St. Agnes School in Alexandria, Virginia.

College career

Wilkins played college football at the University of Virginia.  After spending his freshman season as a backup running back, he converted to wide receiver.  Despite his small size (5'8 and 180 pounds), Wilkins excelled at this role.  He finished his next three seasons with 97 receptions for 1,495 yards (5th in school history) and 5 touchdowns, while adding another 1,155 return yards on special teams.  In his senior season, Wilkins led the team with 45 receptions for 811 yards, an average of 18 yards per catch.

NFL career

Wilkins went undrafted and signed with the Colts as a free agent in 1999.  He served as the team's starting returner for kickoffs and punts, and eventually made it into the starting lineup on offense as well, finishing third on the team in receiving, while racking up a total of 2,089 total yards.  This set the record for most yards gained by an undrafted rookie, and made him one of only six rookies ever to gain more than 2,000 yards.  He spent two more years with the Colts before being traded to the St. Louis Rams for a 6th round draft pick. After spending 2003 back with the Colts, it would be three more years before he would play another regular season game.  After a little time on the Miami Dolphins roster in 2004, Wilkins was out of the NFL until 2006, when he rejoined the Colts.  At 31 years old, Wilkins put up a career high 1,297 kickoff return yards (9th in the NFL) and another 411 total return yards in Indianapolis' 4 postseason games.  In the Colts 29-17 Super Bowl XLI victory, Wilkins returned 4 kickoffs for 89 yards and 3 punts for 42.  It turned out to be his final NFL game.

Career statistics

References

External links
Terrence Wilkins' Biography

1975 births
Living people
African-American players of American football
African-American players of Canadian football
American football return specialists
American football wide receivers
Calgary Stampeders players
Canadian football wide receivers
Indianapolis Colts players
Players of American football from Washington, D.C.
St. Louis Rams players
Virginia Cavaliers football players
20th-century African-American sportspeople